Multan Public School and College is a boys' and girls' school in Multan, Multan Public School (boys) is one of the largest schools in the province Punjab, Pakistan. There are two branches, one for boys and other for girls. Both branches are nearby each other near Pakistan's largest university "Bahauddin Zakariya University" also known as BZU.

History 
Multan Public School & College (MPS&C) is one of the biggest schools of the Southern Punjab. The credit of establishing the school goes to the then Commissioner of Multan Division, Mr. Farid ud Din Ahmed. An officer of Dynamic Personality and vivid foresight, imbibed with idea of educational uplift of the region. In 1985, school was started in a rented building in Pir Khursheed Colony whilst its first building became functional in 1987. The second and third blocks were ready by 1988.

It has many grounds for playing different games like a cricket oval, tennis and squash courts, hockey ground and football ground.

Transport 
15 Buses, 5 small vehicles for pick and drop service for students and employees.

External links
https://web.archive.org/web/20090330150502/http://mpsboys.edu.pk/ 
https://www.facebook.com/MultanPublicSchool

Educational institutions established in 1985
Schools in Multan
1985 establishments in Pakistan